Shasha Forest Reserve is a forest reserve situated in SW Nigeria at an altitude of 146 meters. (7° 4' 60 N 4° 30' 0 E).

This is a biologically unique area.  It was in danger of deforestation and excessive hunting, so it has been in the protection program since 2007.

See also
Oluwa Forest Reserve

References

External links